Duke of Genoa was a subsidiary title of the King of Sardinia. It was first awarded in 1815 to Prince Charles Felix of Savoy, who became the King of Sardinia in 1821.

Upon the death of King Charles Felix in 1831, the title was given to Prince Ferdinando, the second son of King Charles Albert of Sardinia. The title became extinct in 1996 on the death of Prince Eugenio, a great-grandson of King Charles Albert.

List of Dukes of Genoa

See also

 Duchess of Genoa

External links

 
Lists of Italian nobility
1815 establishments in Italy
1996 disestablishments in Italy
Dukedoms of Italy
Lists of dukes
Noble titles created in 1831